Robert Manning Moody (born July 23, 1939) was bishop of the Episcopal Diocese of Oklahoma from 1989 to 2007.

Early life and education
Born in Baltimore, Maryland, his doctor father moved his family to Houston, Texas, where they were members of St Martin's parish. Moody attended the local public schools and graduated from Rice University in 1962 and from the University of Texas the following year. His parish then sponsored him at the Virginia Theological Seminary, where he decided to become a priest and received an M.Div. degree in 1966. He would later return and received an D.Div. in 1988.

Ordained ministry 
Ordained as a deacon on June 21, 1966, he was ordained to the priesthood on May 29, 1967 by bishop J. Milton Richardson. After ordination, he became a chaplain at Baylor University 1966–1968, then priest in charge of St Matthew's church in Waco, Texas and vicar at St James Church in McGregor, Texas before becoming an assistant at the Church of St John the Divine in Houston, Texas, and serving at St James Church in Riverton, Wyoming. He served as rector of Grace Church in Alexandria, Virginia (1985-1987) prior to his election as Bishop of Oklahoma.

Episcopacy
Moody was elected as the Coadjutor Bishop of Oklahoma on September 19, 1987, at St Paul's Cathedral on the first ballot. He was then consecrated to the episcopate on February 6, 1988 by Presiding Bishop Edmond L. Browning. During his episcopate, he dealt with the aftermath of the bombing of the Murrah federal bombing (evacuating a housing development, providing pastoral assistance in a nearby hospital and distributing over $500,000 to those in financial need), and pursued an active ministry among the Native Americans (appointing an Indian missioner and developing a center for Indian ministry in Watonga, Oklahoma). He retired in 2007.

References 

Living people
1939 births
Religious leaders from Baltimore
Rice University alumni
University of Texas alumni
Virginia Theological Seminary alumni
Episcopal bishops of Oklahoma